Doru Sechelariu (born 19 November 1992 in Bacău, Romania) is a Romanian racecar driver. He is the son of Dumitru Sechelariu, who was the mayor of Bacău from 1996 to 2004.

Career

Karting
Sechelariu began his motorsport career in karting back in 2002, winning in the Mini class of the FRAK Cup. In 2005 he finished 15th in the ICA Junior class of the Italian championship.

Formula Renault
Sechelariu moved into single-seaters in 2006, competing in Formula Renault 1.6 Belgium for Thierry Boutsen Racing. After two races at the end of the 2006 season, the Romanian driver moved up to the Belgian series for the 2007 season, with the same team. He finished in sixth place in the standings.

Formula BMW
In 2007 he participated in six races of the Formula BMW UK championship with Räikkönen Robertson Racing. He finished in 22nd place in the standings with 42 points.

The following season, Sechelariu competed in the new Formula BMW Europe series for Fortec Motorsport. He finished fifteenth in the standings, taking nine points-scoring positions in sixteen races. Also he briefly participated in the Americas and Pacific series, taking two wins at the Singapore Street Circuit in the latter.

For 2009, the Romanian driver remained in the series, but switched to FMS International. He again changed team to Motaworld Racing after Coloni took full control of the FMS International from Valencia onwards. At the final two rounds at Spa and Monza, Sechelariu drove for Eifelland Racing. He finished fourteenth behind Swedish rookie Timmy Hansen in the championship.

GP3 Series
In 2010, Sechelariu became the first driver to join Tech 1 Racing for the 2010 GP3 Series season. He finished 29th in the standings, with zero points and a best finish of ninth. Sechelariu was set to remain with Tech 1 Racing for the 2011 season, but a lack of funding forced him to leave the championship.

Personal life
Sechelariu's hobbies are skiing, basketball, tennis, and his favourite circuit is the Circuit de Spa-Francorchamps. His favourite drivers are Fernando Alonso and Giancarlo Fisichella.

Racing record

Career summary

† As Sechelariu was a guest driver, he was ineligible to score points.

Complete GP3 Series results
(key) (Races in bold indicate pole position) (Races in italics indicate fastest lap)

References

External links
 Official website
 

1992 births
Living people
Romanian racing drivers
Belgian Formula Renault 1.6 drivers
Formula BMW UK drivers
Formula BMW Pacific drivers
Formula BMW USA drivers
Formula BMW Europe drivers
Euroformula Open Championship drivers
GP3 Series drivers
Sportspeople from Bacău
Double R Racing drivers
Fortec Motorsport drivers
Team Meritus drivers
Tech 1 Racing drivers
Eifelland Racing drivers
EuroInternational drivers
Motaworld Racing drivers
De Villota Motorsport drivers
Scuderia Coloni drivers
Boutsen Ginion Racing drivers